This is a list of the Leaders of the Opposition of the Yukon Territory, Canada, since 1978 when responsible government was given to the territory. Prior to 1978 the territory had a legislature which had a largely advisory role and no political parties or government leader. Instead powers were invested in a governing Commissioner appointed by the federal government.

**In 1992, the Progressive Conservative Party in the Yukon changed its name to the Yukon Party.

See also
 List of Yukon commissioners
 Lists of incumbents
 List of premiers of Yukon

 
Yukon
Leaders of Opposition
Yukon
Leaders of Opposition